Nahrevan (also Romanized as Nahrevān, Nahravān, and Nahrwān; also known as Nakhrvan and Nīrūbān) is a village in Sojas Rud Rural District, Sojas Rud District, Khodabandeh County, Zanjan Province, Iran. At the 2006 census, its population was 305, in 65 families.

References 

Populated places in Khodabandeh County